The Association for Project Management is a British professional organisation for project and programme management. It received a Royal Charter in 2017, and is a registered charity. It has over 37,500 individual and 550 corporate members, and is the largest professional body of its kind in the United Kingdom. The head office is in Princes Risborough in Buckinghamshire. It is the certification body in the United Kingdom for the International Project Management Association.

History 
The association was founded in 1972 as the UK branch of INTERNET, now the International Project Management Association. Weaver (2007) recalled, that: 
"The UK branch of INTERNET (now the APM), was originated by the ‘pioneering seven’ whose meeting at an INTERNET (later IPMA) expert seminar in Zurich in 1971 inspired them to start a UK branch, which held its first meeting in London in May 1972. The first executive meeting on  INTERNET(UK) was held in the lobby of the Sheraton Hotel, Stockholm on 13 May 1972 during the 3rd annual world congress of INTERNET. Jack Grimshaw was the original chairman, others in the founding group included Dr Jim Gordon and Dennis Gower. Annual membership fees were set at £1, and within a month membership had reached 78 (PMI at the time were charging £7). 
With the emergence of the internet in the 1990s, the global project management association INTERNET was renamed International Project Management Association (IPMA) and the UK Branch Association for Project Management (APM).

It received its Royal Charter on 6 January 2017.

Presidents 

 1972 - 1978 : Geoffrey Trimble 
 1978 - 1984 : David Firnberg
 1984 - 1991 : Monty Finniston
 1991 - 2000 : Sir Bob Reid 
 2000 - 2004 : Tony Ridley

2004 - 2010 : Martin Barnes 
 2012 - 2015 : Tom Taylor 
 2015 - 2019 : David Waboso
 2019 - : Sue Kershaw

Chairman 

 1972 - 1977 : Jack Grimshaw
 1977 - 1979 : Herbert Walton
 1982 - 1986 : Eric Gabriel
 1986 - 1991 : Martin Barnes
 1991 - 1993 : Tim Carter 
 1993 - 1996 : Peter Morris
 1996 - 1998 : Rodney Turner

 2000 - 2003 : Donald Heath
 2003 - 2004 : Miles Shepherd
 2004 - 2008 : Tom Taylor
 2008 - 2012 : Mike Nichols
 2012 - 2014 : Tom Taylor
 2014 - 2016 : Steve Wake 
 2016 - : John McGlynn

See also
 Office of Government Commerce
 Construction Industry Council

References

External links 
 

Business and finance professional associations
1972 establishments in the United Kingdom
Organisations based in Buckinghamshire
Organizations established in 1972
Project Management
Project management professional associations
Wycombe District